Ann Patricia Bailey "Pat" Caplan,  (born 13 March 1942) is a retired British anthropologist and academic. From 1989 to 2003, she was Professor of Social Anthropology at Goldsmiths College, University of London. She was also the Director of the Institute of Commonwealth Studies between 1998 and 2000.

Early life and education
Caplan was born on 13 March 1942 to Sylvester Launcelot Bailey and Marjorie Bailey (née Parr). From 1960 to 1963, she studied for a Bachelor of Arts (BA) degree in African Studies (Swahili) at the SOAS  University of London, University of London. She then undertook postgraduate studies in social anthropology at the University of London, and completed a Master of Arts (MA) degree in 1965. In 1968 she gained a Doctor of Philosophy (PhD) degree with a thesis titled Non-unilineal kinship on Mafia Island, Tanzania.

Academic career
Caplan worked as a tutor at Birkbeck College, University of London, for the 1964/1965 and 1968/1969 academic years, and as a tutor at the Open University in the 1970/1971 and 1974/1975 academic years. She was a postdoctoral fellow at the School of Oriental and African Studies, University of London from 1968 to 1970 and from 1974 to 1976.

In 1977, Caplan joined Goldsmiths College, University of London, as a lecturer in anthropology; she was later promoted to senior lecturer. Goldsmiths did not have an Anthropology Department until the 1980s. In 1989, she was appointed Professor of Social Anthropology. From 1998 to 2000, she was also Director of the Institute of Commonwealth Studies of the School of Advanced Study, University of London.

Caplan retired in 2003 and was appointed Emeritus Professor.

Personal life
In 1967, the then Pat Bailey married Lionel Caplan. Together they have two children: one son and one daughter.

Honours
In 1995, Caplan was elected a Fellow of the Royal Anthropological Institute (FRAI).

Selected works
 
 
 
 
 
 
 
 
 
 
 
 
 
The papers of Pat and Lionel Caplan, comprising field notes as well as material relating to the subsequent publication of books and articles based on fieldwork are held by SOAS Archives

References

1942 births
Living people
British anthropologists
British women anthropologists
Social anthropologists
Academics of Goldsmiths, University of London
Academics of the Institute of Commonwealth Studies, London
Alumni of SOAS University of London
Academics of Birkbeck, University of London
Academics of the Open University
Academics of SOAS University of London
Fellows of the Royal Anthropological Institute of Great Britain and Ireland